Kentucky's 11th congressional district was a district of the United States House of Representatives in Kentucky. It was lost to redistricting in 1933. Its last Representative was Charles Finley.

List of members representing the district

References

 Congressional Biographical Directory of the United States 1774–present

11
Former congressional districts of the United States
1823 establishments in Kentucky
Constituencies established in 1823
Constituencies disestablished in 1933
1933 disestablishments in Kentucky